is a professional Japanese football player who plays as a winger for J1 League club Cerezo Osaka.

Club statistics

References

External links
Profile at Cerezo Osaka

1997 births
Living people
Association football people from Okinawa Prefecture
Japanese footballers
J1 League players
J2 League players
J3 League players
FC Ryukyu players
Fagiano Okayama players
Cerezo Osaka players
Association football forwards